Brindaban (Nepali: बृन्दावन) is a municipality in Rautahat District, a part of Province No. 2 in Nepal. It was formed in 2016 occupying current 9 sections (wards) from previous 9 former VDCs. It occupies an area of 95.40 km2 with a total population of 42,735. It is bounded on the east by Sarlahi district, on the west by Chandrapur and Gujara municipalities, on the north by Chandrapur municipality and on the south by Gadhimai and Garuda municipalities.

References 

Populated places in Rautahat District
Nepal municipalities established in 2017
Municipalities in Madhesh Province